Robertkochia solimangrovi is a Gram-negative and strictly aerobic bacterium from the genus of Robertkochia which has been isolated from mangrove soil from the Malaysia Tanjung Piai National Park.

References

Flavobacteria
Bacteria described in 2020